The 1988–89 Essex Senior Football League season was the 18th in the history of Essex Senior Football League, a football competition in England.

League table

The league featured 15 clubs which competed in the league last season, along with two new clubs:
Southend Manor, joined from the Reserve division
Stambridge

League table

References

Essex Senior Football League seasons
1988–89 in English football leagues